Lise Eliot is Professor of Neuroscience at the Chicago Medical School at Rosalind Franklin University of Medicine and Science. She is best known for her book,  on the gender differences between boys and girls, Pink Brain, Blue Brain: How Small Differences Grow into Troublesome Gaps and What We Can Do About It (Houghton Mifflin Harcourt 2009).

She also writes for Slate Magazine, and is the author of What's Going on in There? How the Brain and Mind Develop in the First Five Years of Life (Bantam, 2000).

Publications

See also
 Gendered associations of pink and blue
 Gender polarization
 Gender stereotyping

References

External links
 Lise Eliot web page
 Faculty listing

American neuroscientists
American women neuroscientists
Living people
Rosalind Franklin University of Medicine and Science faculty
Year of birth missing (living people)
New Trier High School alumni
Columbia University alumni
Harvard College alumni
American women academics
21st-century American women